Marpissa muscosa is a species of jumping spider.

On average, females have body length ranging from 7.5–14mm, whereas males have a body length ranging from 6–8.1mm. Both sexes are coloured grey to brown. The whole spider has a furry appearance and is flattened in shape.

The species builds a kind of nest under the bark of dead trees. Up to 100 of these nests can occur side by side. As other species of Marpissa spiders, it demonstrates a social hierarchy: weaker animals will acknowledge their inferiority by strutting their front legs and slowly retreating from the scene. Early environmental conditions shape personality types in the developing spiders.

Distribution
Marpissa muscosa lives in the Palaearctic.

Though rare in England, it is found throughout the country, more in the south and east. The species is widespread in northern Europe.

Habitat
These spiders are typically found on spruce and pine trees, under bark, in moor- and heathland, and around buildings.

References

External links

Salticidae
Spiders of Europe
Spiders described in 1757
Taxa named by Carl Alexander Clerck
Palearctic spiders